Gadella maraldi, the gadella or morid cod, is a species of fish in the family Moridae from the warmer waters of the north eastern Atlantic Ocean and the Mediterranean Sea.

Description
Its upper jaw has two rows of teeth, the outer row is made up of small teeth interspersed with notably large ones; the inner one only has small teeth. The anal fin originates on the anterior third of body, under the origin of anterior dorsal fin while the pectoral fins reach well past the origin of the anal fin. The filamentous ray of the pelvic fins extends slightly beyond the anal fin origin. It is generally dark in colour with a pale mouth cavity.

Distribution
Gadella maraldi is found in the warmer waters of the north eastern Atlantic from the southern Atlantic coast of Portugal south to west Africa, its southern limit in Africa being uncertain. Its Atlantic range includes the Canary Islands, Madeira and the Azores, as well as the Grand Meteor Bank. In the Mediterranean Sea it occurs from the coast of Spain and the Balearics to the Aegean Sea and Levantine Sea. It has been recorded as far north as Galicia and three specimens were taken from the Porcupine Bank off Ireland in the 21st Century.

Habitat and ecology
Gadella maraldi is a benthopelagic fish which can be found on the upper continental slope, over hard substrates at depths ranging from 150 to 700 m, to 368–748m in the east Ionian Sea. Spawning most likely takes place in the Spring and it has pelagic larvae. Its diet is not known. It attains sexual maturity at a length of 15 cm.

Fisheries
It is taken as a bycatch and occasionally recorded in markets but it is not a commercially significant species.

Naming
The specific name maraldi honours the French-Italian astronomer and mathematician Giacomo F. Maraldi (1665-1729), who was also known as Jacques Maraldi.

References

Moridae
Fish of the Atlantic Ocean
Fish of the Mediterranean Sea
Marine fauna of North Africa
Fauna of Macaronesia
Fish described in 1810
Taxa named by Antoine Risso